Elasmias wakefieldiae, also known as Wakefield's miniature treesnail, is a species of tree snail that is endemic to Australia.

Description
The globose, ovately conical shell of adult snails is 2.4–2.6 mm in height, with a diameter of 2–2.1 mm, with weakly impressed sutures and rounded whorls with fine spiral grooves. It is transparent white with the apical whorls appearing golden-brown in the living animal. The umbilicus is imperforate. The aperture is subovate. The animal is transparent and colourless.

Habitat
The snail occurs in south-eastern Queensland and New South Wales, as well as on Australia's Lord Howe Island in the Tasman Sea. It lives in trees and in leaf litter.

References

wakefieldiae
Gastropods of Australia
Gastropods of Lord Howe Island
Taxa named by James Charles Cox
Gastropods described in 1868